Barry Davis (born 15 September 1943) is a former Australian rules footballer who played in the Victorian Football League (VFL) with Essendon and North Melbourne, before coaching his original team between 1978 and 1980.

Playing career

Essendon Football Club

In the summer of 1961 Barry Davis and a school friend were asked to train with Essendon in a bid to play in the Under 19s. Davis impressed observers and he was asked to participate in pre-season practice matches that included players from the main list.  He played in the Reserves for round 1 of the 1961 season.
Recruited from Essendon High School Davis made his debut with Essendon Football Club in the VFL in the second round of 1961, Davis played off the half-back line and was quite a prolific ball-gathering player. Davis never played with the under 19s even though he was eligible.

He went on to play 218 games and kick 65 goals for the club, winning the Bombers' best and fairest award three times – in 1968, 1969 and 1971. He captained the side in 1970 and 1971, also played in the team premierships in 1962 and 1965. He was named in Essendon's official 'Team of the Twentieth Century'.

North Melbourne Football Club
Moving to North in 1973 under the VFL's short-lived "10-year rule", which allowed players with ten years' service at one club to move to another club without a clearance, Davis won North Melbourne's best and fairest in his first year at North. He went on to captain the Roos' first ever premiership side in 1975, his final VFL season. He had played 71 games and kicked 54 goals for North before retiring. He was also named in North Melbourne's team of the century.

Coaching career

Essendon Football Club
Davis coached his original club Essendon as senior coach from 1978 to 1980, when he replaced Bill Stephen who was sacked as Essendon Football Club senior coach at the end of the 1977 season. Davis coached Essendon with a 30 win, 36 losses and 1 draw record. He resigned at the end of the 1980 season because Essendon under Davis did not make the top five on the ladder and therefore missed out of the finals. He then made way for Kevin Sheedy, who replaced Davis as Essendon Football Club senior coach and coached the club until the end of the 2007 season, for a total of 27 years.

Champions of Essendon 
In 2002 an Essendon panel ranked him at 15 in their Champions of Essendon list of the 25 greatest players ever to have played for Essendon.

Statistics

|-
|- style="background-color: #EAEAEA"
! scope="row" style="text-align:center" | 1961
|style="text-align:center;"|
| 32 || 17 || 14 ||  ||  ||  ||  ||  ||  || 0.8 ||  ||  ||  ||  ||  || 
|-
! scope="row" style="text-align:center;" | 1962
|style="text-align:center;"|
| 32 || 17 || 0 ||  ||  ||  ||  ||  ||  || 0 ||  ||  ||  ||  ||  || 
|- style="background-color: #EAEAEA"
! scope="row" style="text-align:center" | 1963
|style="text-align:center;"|
| 32 || 18 || 1 ||  ||  ||  ||  ||  ||  || 0.1 ||  ||  ||  ||  ||  || 
|-
! scope="row" style="text-align:center" | 1964
|style="text-align:center;"|
| 32 || 16 || 0 ||  ||  ||  ||  ||  ||  || 0.0 ||  ||  ||  ||  ||  || 
|- style="background-color: #EAEAEA"
! scope="row" style="text-align:center;" | 1965
|style="text-align:center;"|
| 32 || 12 || 0 || 0 || 126 || 23 || 149 || 61 ||  || 0.0 || 0.0 || 10.5 || 1.9 || 12.4 || 5.1 || 
|-
! scope="row" style="text-align:center" | 1966
|style="text-align:center;"|
| 32 || 20 || 1 || 2 || 275 || 30 || 305 || 82 ||  || 0.1 || 0.1 || 13.8 || 1.5 || 15.3 || 4.1 || 
|- style="background-color: #EAEAEA"
! scope="row" style="text-align:center" | 1967
|style="text-align:center;"|
| 32 || 17 || 0 || 0 || 292 || 32 || 324 || 72 ||  || 0.0 || 0.0 || 17.2 || 1.9 || 19.1 || 4.2 || 
|-
! scope="row" style="text-align:center" | 1968
|style="text-align:center;"|
| 32 || 22 || 1 || 8 || 394 || 87 || 481 || 136 ||  || 0.0 || 0.4 || 17.9 || 4.0 || 21.9 || 6.2 || 
|- style="background-color: #EAEAEA"
! scope="row" style="text-align:center" | 1969
|style="text-align:center;"|
| 32 || 19 || 18 || 18 || 446 || 90 || 536 || 134 ||  || 0.9 || 0.9 || 23.5 || 4.7 || 28.2 || 7.1 || 
|-
! scope="row" style="text-align:center" | 1970
|style="text-align:center;"|
| 32 || 19 || 17 || 23 || 382 || 85 || 467 || 101 ||  || 0.9 || 1.2 || 20.1 || 4.5 || 24.6 || 5.3 || 
|- style="background-color: #EAEAEA"
! scope="row" style="text-align:center" | 1971
|style="text-align:center;"|
| 32 || 19 || 11 || 23 || 400 || 62 || 462 || 132 ||  || 0.6 || 1.2 || 21.1 || 3.3 || 24.3 || 6.9 || 
|-
! scope="row" style="text-align:center" | 1972
|style="text-align:center;"|
| 32 || 22 || 2 || 2 || 376 || 34 || 410 || 106 ||  || 0.1 || 0.1 || 17.1 || 1.5 || 18.6 || 4.8 || 
|- style="background-color: #EAEAEA"
! scope="row" style="text-align:center" | 1973
|style="text-align:center;"|
| 32 || 21 || 19 || 19 || 466 || 67 || 533 || 89 ||  || 0.9 || 0.9 || 22.2 || 3.2 || 25.4 || 4.2 || 
|-
! scope="row" style="text-align:center" | 1974
|style="text-align:center;"|
| 32 || 24 || 21 || 16 || 461 || 92 || 553 || 113 ||  || 0.9 || 0.7 || 19.2 || 3.8 || 23.0 || 4.7 || 
|- style="background-color: #EAEAEA"
! scope="row" style="text-align:center;" | 1975
|style="text-align:center;"|
| 32 || 26 || 14 || 12 || bgcolor="b7e718"| 503 || 106 || bgcolor="b7e718"| 609 || 102 ||  || 0.5 || 0.5 || 20.1 || 4.2 || 24.4 || 4.1 || 
|- class="sortbottom"
! colspan=3| Career
! 289
! 119
! 123
! 4121
! 708
! 4829
! 1128
! 
! 0.4
! 0.6
! 18.7
! 3.2
! 22.0
! 5.1
! 
|}

See also
 The 1965-66 Victorian District Cricket final

References

External links

 Barry Davis: Boyles Football Photos.

1943 births
Living people
Essendon Football Club coaches
Essendon Football Club players
Essendon Football Club Premiership players
Champions of Essendon
North Melbourne Football Club players
North Melbourne Football Club Premiership players
Syd Barker Medal winners
Australian Football Hall of Fame inductees
Crichton Medal winners
Australian rules footballers from Victoria (Australia)
Three-time VFL/AFL Premiership players